Kozhi Koovuthu may refer to:

 Kozhi Koovuthu (1982 film), a 1982 Tamil-language Indian feature film
 Kozhi Koovuthu (2012 film), a 2012 Indian film